Edward Barker (died 1602) was an English politician.

He was a Member (MP) of the Parliament of England for Mitchell in 1584, St Germans in 1586, Andover in 1593, Taunton in 1597, and Downton in 1601.

References

16th-century births
1602 deaths
English MPs 1584–1585
English MPs 1586–1587
English MPs 1593
English MPs 1597–1598
English MPs 1601
Members of the Parliament of England for Mitchell
Members of the Parliament of England (pre-1707) for St Germans
Members of the Parliament of England for Taunton